The Central Florida Research Park (CFRP) is a research park abutting the main campus of the University of Central Florida (UCF) in Orlando, Florida, United States. CFRP is the largest research park in Florida, the fourth largest in the United States by number of companies, and the seventh largest in the United States by number of employees. CFRP is home to numerous centers hosted by the United States Department of Defense, UCF, and private corporations.

Park
The Park was established as a result of legislation passed by the Florida Legislature in 1978, and is a cooperative effort between the University of Central Florida, the Orange County Research and Development Authority, and the Orange County Board of County Commissioners. The governing body of the Park is the Orange County Research and Development Authority. The university and officials of CFRP believe that the potential for the establishment of close ties between the university and industry will create an attractive environment conducive to the location of research-oriented industry in the Park. This activity will enrich and support the academic, teaching, and research programs of the university. Businesses can purchase or lease land in the park on which to construct a facility or can lease space for office, lab, or light manufacturing activities.

Partnerships
Significant organizations, including the Institute for Simulation and Training, National Center for Simulation, Team Orlando, and the National Center for Forensic Science, are located in the Research Park. 

Given the importance of simulation and training to the Department of Defense, an extensive military presence is also located in the park centered on the Orlando area's last remaining active duty military installation, Naval Support Activity Orlando.  Tenant commands at NSA Orlando include the Naval Air Warfare Center Training Systems Division (NAWCTSD), the US Army Program Executive Office for Simulation, Training, and Instrumentation (PEO STRI), Research, Development and Engineering Command United States Army Simulation and Training Technology Center (STTC), Marine Corps Program Manager for Training Systems (PM TRASYS), and the Air Force Agency for Modeling and Simulation (AFAMS). Over $1.4 billion in federal contracts is awarded by the U.S. military each year for activities in and in the vicinity of the park.

Notable tenants
 Aon Hewitt
 AT&T Inc.
 BAE Systems Land & Armaments
 Bank of America
 Boeing
 Booz Allen Hamilton
 CAE
 Cisco Systems
 Cubic
 Florida Technical College
 General Dynamics
 Hewlett-Packard
 Kaplan University
 L-3 Communications
 Leidos
 National Center for Simulation
 Northrop Grumman
 Raytheon
 Rockwell Collins
 SAIC
 Siemens
 United States Army Corps of Engineers
 United States Geological Survey
 Wyle Labs

NOTE:  
 Lockheed Martin maintains a large facility dedicated to simulation and training approximately 3.5 miles southwest of the Central Florida Research Park.
 Camber Corporation maintained facilities in the Central Florida Research Park until relocating to The Quadrangle business park, approximately 1.5 miles to the northwest.  It later relocated back to the south side of the park.  In December 2016, Camber Corporation was acquired by Huntington Ingalls Industries, which continues to maintain this facility.

See also
Innovation Way
University of Central Florida research centers

References

External links

Central Florida Research Park

Economy of Florida
Buildings and structures in Orlando, Florida
Science parks in the United States
University of Central Florida
1978 establishments in Florida